The 2022 Pan American Table Tennis Championships were held in Santiago, Chile, from 31 October to 6 November 2022.

Medal summary

Events

Medal table

References

Pan American Table Tennis Championships
Pan American Table Tennis Championships
Pan American Table Tennis Championships
Sports competitions in Santiago
International sports competitions hosted by Chile
Pan American Table Tennis Championships
Pan American Table Tennis Championships